The Electoral district of Swan Hill was a rural Lower House electoral district of the Victorian Parliament. It was located within the Northern Victoria Region of the Legislative Council.

The area had previously been part of the electoral districts of Wimmera (1851-89), Crowlands (1858-77), and Donald & Swan Hill (1889-1904).

At its beginning in 1904, the district spanned the Victorian Mallee region, covering not only Swan Hill and its surrounds, but also the Mildura area. This changed in 1927, with the creation of the electoral district of Mildura. It was held by a conservative party for its entire existence. For most of the time from 1917 onward, it was held by what became the National Party. The Liberals held the seat for most of the 1970s, during the height of their dominance in the state. However, the Nationals regained it in a 1983 by-election and held it until the seat was abolished in 2014.

At its end in 2014, the district included the towns of Birchip, Charlton, Donald, Kerang, Murtoa, St Arnaud, Sea Lake, Warracknabeal, Wedderburn and Wycheproof, as well as the titular city of Swan Hill.  Natural features of the electorate included Lake Tyrrell and the Murray River, which was a popular tourist destination and the centre of a flourishing irrigation area. Farming and agriculture were important industries throughout the region.

Due to the region making up an increasingly smaller proportion of the state's population, in 2014 it became part of the electoral district of Murray Plains.

Members for Swan Hill

Election results

See also
 Parliaments of the Australian states and territories
 List of members of the Victorian Legislative Assembly

References

External links
 Electorate profile: Swan Hill District, Victorian Electoral Commission

Former electoral districts of Victoria (Australia)
1904 establishments in Australia
2014 disestablishments in Australia